Halgerda abyssicola is a species of sea slug, a dorid nudibranch, a shell-less marine gastropod mollusk in the family Discodorididae.

Distribution
This species was described from a specimen collected at Vanuatu at depths of 207–280 m. An additional specimen included in the original description is from Bank Nova, Coral Sea at depths of 385–420 m.

References

Discodorididae
Gastropods described in 2000